Cumulative quantities are a concept in logistics that involves adding up required materials quantities over a defined time-window that can be drawn as a 'cumulative curve'. This concept is applied in serial production and mainly used in the automotive industry to plan, control and monitor production and delivery. The concept is sometimes called 'Cumulative Production Figures Principle' (CPGP).

Closed-loop-cycle 
The Concept of Cumulative Quantities (CCQ) uses the feedback mechanism of a closed loop, which can be found in industrial, engineering and electronic systems. The target requirements are summarized for each time-interval and compared with the actual values for closed-loop control. Positive cumulative deviation for a certain time-interval requires no further order, while negative deviations require a new order. To "calm" production and material flow upper and lower tolerance boundaries are defined and only if these boundaries are violated is a renewed order.

To check the entire production and material flow 'reporting limits' can be defined at a chosen counting point and if a limit is exceeded a concerned 'alert' is issued. The logistics staff has to explain the reason for the 'alert'. If the reason is correct and traceable no further action is needed. If mistakes are present in the database, data processing or in data-acquisition appropriate counter-measures are needed. Examples for mistakes or failures  wrong primary demand or bad forecasting, mistakes in Bill of Material or master data, old Master Production Schedule, inaccurate or delayed data acquisition, calculation mistakes, mounting of incorrect parts at assembly line.

Counting points  
Target-actual-control-loop uses exactly defined counting points that demarcate the next-following intervals along the supply chain. The cumulative differences of next-following counting points show the quantities of material items which traverse the Interval and therefore offer transparency of the inventory of an item along the entire supply chain.

Supply chain  
Cumulative quantities are a part of official EDI-formats (e.g. EDIFACT - DELFOR) that are widely used by OEMs and their suppliers. Normally the data acquisition at 'goods receipt' are used for communication between consignee and goods dispatcher.

See also 
 Enterprise Resource Planning
 Material Requirements Planning

Literature 
 
 .

References

External links 

 SAP-HELP-COM 

Logistics
Supply chain management